The Best is the first compilation album by American country music artist Dan Seals. It features his highest charting songs from his previous four albums beginning with Rebel Heart (1983). The album has been certified platinum. The new track, "One Friend" was originally found on his 1984 album San Antone, and was re-recorded for this album, and was released as a single and became his seventh number one song in a row.

Track listing

Personnel on Track 11
Adapted from liner notes.

Eddie Bayers - drums
Dennis Burnside - piano
Larry Byrom - electric guitar
Mark Casstevens - acoustic guitar
Steve Gibson - acoustic guitar
Scott Kaufman - percussion
Shane Keister - synthesizer
The Nashville String Machine - strings
Dan Seals - acoustic guitar, lead vocals, background vocals
Bergen White - string arrangements
Jack Williams - bass guitar

Charts

Weekly charts

Year-end charts

Certifications

References

Dan Seals albums
Albums produced by Kyle Lehning
1987 greatest hits albums
Capitol Records compilation albums